Peter Mills may refer to:

Peter Mills (1598–1670), English bricklayer and architect
Peter Mills (American politician) (born 1943), American politician from Maine
Peter Mills (British politician) (1921–1993), British Conservative politician
Peter Mills (1927–1988), pretender to the Byzantine throne
Peter Mills (badminton) (born 1988), English badminton player
 Peter Mills (Chicago Fire), a fictional character from the TV series Chicago Fire
Peter Mills (composer), composer of musicals
Peter Mills (field hockey) (born 1945), British Olympic hockey player
Peter Mills (golfer) (born 1931), English golfer
Peter Mills (RAF officer) (born 1955), Church of Scotland minister and former head of the RAF Chaplains Branch
Peter Mills (cricketer) (born 1958), English cricketer
Peter Mills (slave) (1861–1972), allegedly the last known surviving American slave